Michael A. Arnzen (born May 17, 1967) is an American horror writer. He has won the Bram Stoker Award three times.

Early life and education 
Arnzen was born on May 17, 1967, in Amityville, New York. After a brief stint in the United States Army overseas, where he began writing horror stories to entertain his fellow soldiers, he moved to Colorado, where he began his writing career.

Arnzen received the Bram Stoker Award in 1994 for Grave Markings. Shortly thereafter, he earned a master's degree while working on his second novel, soon followed by his Ph.D. in English at the University of Oregon, where he studied the role of horror and nostalgia in 20th-century culture in a dissertation called The Popular Uncanny.

100 Jolts (Raw Dog Screaming Press) features 100 of Arnzen's flash fiction stories. His short story collection, Fluid Mosaic (Wildside Press) collects his best stories from the 1990s. His poetry chapbooks include Freakcidents, Gorelets: Unpleasant Poetry, Dying (With No Apologies to Martha Stewart), Paratabloids, Chew, Sportuary, and Writhing in Darkness. His most recent published work is Play Dead, a crime thriller with a poker theme.

Arnzen holds a Ph.D. in English and presently teaches graduate studies in Seton Hill University's Writing Popular Fiction Program and undergraduate English courses at Seton Hill University in Greensburg, Pennsylvania.

Arnzen runs Mastication Publications, an umbrella imprint for creative ephemera, chapbooks, collector's items and independently published ebooks.

Bibliography

Novels and novellas 
Grave Markings (Dell Books 2004)  Winner, Bram Stoker Award Superior Achievement in a First Novel 
 Play Dead (Raw Dog Screaming Press, 2005)
 Bitchfight (Bad Moon Books, 2008)
 Grave Markings: The 20th Anniversary Edition (Raw Dog Screaming Press, 2014)

Short story and flash fiction collections 
 Needles and Sins (Dark Regions Press, 1993)
 Fluid Mosaic and Other Outre Objects D'Art (Wildside Press, 2001)
 100 Jolts (Raw Dog Screaming Press, 2004)   
 Proverbs For Monsters (Dark Regions Press, 2007) Winner, Bram Stoker Award Superior Achievement in a Fiction Collection

Poetry collections 
 Freakcidents
 Gorelets: Unpleasant Poetry
 Dying (With No Apologies to Martha Stewart)
 Paratabloids
 Chew
 Sportuary
 Writhing in Darkness

Non-fiction 
 Many Genres, One Craft (Co-Edited by Michael A. Arnzen and Heidi Ruby Miller) (Headline Books, 2011)
 Instigation: Creative Prompts on the Dark Side (Mastication Publications, 2013)

See also

List of horror fiction authors

References

External links
 Michael Arnzen's official site
 100 Jolts
 Raw Dog Screaming Press
 Pedablogue

American horror novelists
21st-century American novelists
People from Greensburg, Pennsylvania
University of Oregon alumni
Seton Hill University
Living people
Novelists from Pennsylvania
People from Amityville, New York
American male novelists
1967 births
21st-century American male writers